Bolskan was an iberian city located in the territory of the Vescetani (an iberian tribe) in NE Spain c. 65 km North of the Ebro river  and lies upon the site now occupied by the modern city of Huesca, in the Iberian Peninsula.

The territory occupied by the Vescetani was destroyed by the Roman praetor Terentius Varro C., to 179 BC, which saw the refoundation of this once Iberian city, with the new name of Osca.

Bolskan is famous for its ancient mint, and amongst its abundant coins are an issue which includes an unidentified Bearded Male Hear facing right on the Obverse, and a Horseman carrying a spear and the name of the city in an Iberian inscription on the Reverse.  The coins of Bolskan change from 37 BC when the city is refounded as Osca and include the Latin inscriptions OSCA on the Obverse and DOM. COS. ITER. IMP on the reverse, these are Denari in denomination.  Both the coins of Bolskan and Osca are found within the Iberian coin collections of the British Museum

References

Huesca
History of Aragon
Roman towns and cities in Spain